Iowa Highway 333 (Iowa 333) is a short highway in southwestern Iowa.  It serves as a connector route between Interstate 29 (I-29) and U.S. Highway 275 (US 275) in Hamburg.  Formerly spanning two counties, Iowa 333 is one of the shortest state highways in Iowa.

Route description
Just  from the western end, the highway crosses a BNSF Railway line. It enters Hamburg's west side along North Street. Two blocks east of Main Street, the route turns north onto Washington Street towards US 275. Iowa 333 passes Hamburg's Clayton Field between A and D Streets before ending at E Street. Northbound US 275 continues north on Washington Street and southbound US 275 travels east on E Street.

History

Iowa 333 was designated in 1935 as a  spur route from US 59 to Northboro. By the end of 1936, the route had been extended east through College Springs and ended at US 71. It absorbed Iowa 84, which ran from US 71 into College Springs. The former Iowa 333 spur into Northboro was redesignated Iowa 343. A few years later, Iowa 333 was extended westward to end at US 275 in Hamburg. This westward extension was reverted in 1964. In 1966, the turn into College Springs was removed from Iowa 333 and became the unsigned Iowa 999.

For four days in December 1980, Iowa 333 consisted of only  of road in Fremont County.  On December 15, 1980, the Iowa Department of Transportation (Iowa DOT) relinquished control of the highway to Page County from the Fremont–Page county line east to US 71.  Four days later, the Iowa DOT took control of County Road J64 from I-29 west of Hamburg to US 59 and included a brief overlap with US 275; this was mostly the same section of road that had previously been a part of Iowa 333 from the late 1930s to the mid 1960s.  The mile-long section of highway east of US 59 was turned over to Fremont County in 1987.

In 2002, the Road Use Tax Fund Committee, a mix of city, county, and state transportation officials, met to review and recommend changes to Iowa's public road system. The report was necessitated by increasing costs to maintain the highway system and a level of funding that was not keeping up with the rising costs. Iowa 333 east of the eastern junction with US 275 was given back to Fremont County and became CR J64 once again.

Major intersections

References

External links

333
Transportation in Fremont County, Iowa